Kristiina Nurk (since 2018 Nurk-Baker; born on 8 July 1972 in Kohtla-Järve) is an Estonian underwater swimmer.

1992 and 1996 she won two bronze medals at World Championships.

1987-1999 she became individually 24-times Estonian champion in different underwater swimming disciplines.

In 1991 she was named to Estonian Athlete of the Year.

Since 2015 she is living in United Kingdom.

References

Living people
1972 births
Estonian female swimmers
Sportspeople from Kohtla-Järve